The digerati (or digirati) are the elite of digitalization, social media, content marketing, computer industry and online communities. The word is a portmanteau, derived from "digital" and "literati", and reminiscent of the earlier coinage glitterati (glitter and literati). Famous computer scientists, tech magazine writers, digital consultants with multi-year experiences and well-known bloggers are included among the digerati.

The word is used in several related but different ways. It can mean:

Opinion leaders who, through their writings, promoted a vision of digital technology and the Internet as a transformational element in society;
People regarded as celebrities within the Silicon Valley computer subculture, particularly during the dot-com boom years;
Anyone regarded as influential within the digital technology community.

Term history

The first mention of the word Digerati on USENET occurred in 1992 by Arthur Wang, and referred to an article by George Gilder in Upside magazine. According to the March 1, 1992 "On Language" column by William Safire in The New York Times Magazine, the term was coined by The New York Times editor Tim Race in a January 1992 New York Times article. In Race's words:

Actually the first use of "digerati" was in a January 29, 1992 New York Times article, "Pools of Memory, Waves of Dispute", by John Markoff, into which I edited the term. The article was about a controversy engendered by a George Gilder article that had recently appeared in Upside magazine. In a March 1, 1992 "On Language" column in The New York Times Magazine, William Safire noted the coinage and gave me the honor of defining it, which we did like so:
Digerati, n.pl. – people highly skilled in the processing and manipulation of digital information; wealthy or scholarly techno-geeks.

See also
Californian Ideology
Netocracy

References

Digerati: Encounters With the Cyber Elite by John Brockman, Hardcover: 354 pages Publisher: Hardwired; 1st ed edition (October 1, 1996)

External links

Digerati talk on costs and benefits of the Internet Coinage attributed to Tim Race
Who are the Digerati?
Wiktionary definition of digerati
Why Digital Maturity Matters – MIT – George Westerman

Internet culture
Neologisms
1990s neologisms